In medicine, obligatory synergies occur when spasticity appears, such as following a stroke. It manifests in abnormal and stereotypical patterns across multiple joints called obligatory synergies. They are described as either a flexion synergy or an extension synergy and affect both the upper and lower extremity (see below). When these patterns occur in a patient, he or she is unable to move a limb segment in isolation of the pattern.  This interferes with normal activities of daily living.  Some aspects of the obligatory synergy patterns however, can be cleverly used to increase function relative to the movement available to the individual. Careful thought should, therefore, be considered in deciding which muscle groups to stretch at specific times during recovery. Obligatory synergy patterns are observed when a patient tries to make a minimal voluntary movement, or as a result of stimulated reflexes.

The flexion synergy for the upper extremity includes scapular retraction and elevation, shoulder abduction and external rotation, elbow flexion, forearm supination, and wrist and finger flexion.

The extension synergy for the upper extremity includes scapular protraction, shoulder adduction and internal rotation, elbow extension, forearm pronation, and wrist and finger flexion.

The flexion synergy for the lower extremity includes hip flexion, abduction and external rotation, knee flexion, ankle dorsiflexion and inversion and toe dorsiflexion.

The extension synergy for the lower extremity includes hip extension, adduction and internal rotation, knee extension, ankle plantar flexion and inversion, and toe plantar flexion.

Note that some muscles are not usually involved in these synergy patterns and include the lattisimus dorsi, teres major, serratus anterior, finger extensors, and ankle evertors.

References

Stroke